Mattese Creek is a stream in St. Louis County in the U.S. state of Missouri. It is a tributary of the Meramec River.

Mattese Creek most likely is a name derived from the French surname Matis.

See also
List of rivers of Missouri

References

Geography of St. Louis
Rivers of St. Louis County, Missouri
Rivers of Missouri